Laishang or Khubam or Ebudhou Ebendhou Khubam ("Ebudhou" means ancestor[male], "Ebendhou" means ancestor[female] and "khubam" means abode) is a holy shrine which are dedicated site for a specific deity,ancestor or similar sacred place where the specific deity or ancestor which are commonly known as Umang Lai ("Umang" means forest and "Lai" means deity/ancestor) of the group of people  which follow Sanamahism faith worship or is given their due respect from time to time.

References 

Shrines
Sanamahism
Sacred natural sites
Worship
Religious places